Mercy Health Defiance Hospital is a hospital in Defiance, Ohio and is part of Mercy Health.

The hospital features an eight-bed emergency center, 17 patient rooms with 23 beds, two operating rooms and two procedure rooms.  The emergency center is open 24 hours a day, seven days a week with a direct link via air ambulance to Level I trauma care at Mercy Heath St. Vincent Medical Center in Toledo.

References

External links
Mercy Health Defiance Hospital

Hospitals in Ohio
Defiance, Ohio